Trofeo Alfredo Binda-Comune di Cittiglio is a women's professional road bicycle racing event held annually in the comune (municipality) of Cittiglio and nearby comunes located within the Province of Varese in the Italian region Lombardy.

Since 2008, the Trofeo Alfredo Binda serves as the second race of the UCI Women's Road World Cup. In 2016, the Trofeo Alfredo Binda became part of the new UCI Women's World Tour.

The field of riders complete a 15.5 km circuit 8 times to determine the winner. The circuit traces Cittiglio, Brenta, Casalzuigno, Casale Alto, Cuveglio, Cuvio, Azzio, Gemonio before returning to Cittiglio. The race consists of two significant climbs on the circuit, which are the Casale Alto, in the early part of the circuit and the climb of Azzio, which typically separates the field as it is located just before the conclusion of the circuit.

Past winners

Source:

Multiple winners

Wins per country

References

External links

 
UCI Women's Road World Cup
Province of Varese
Cycle races in Italy
Recurring sporting events established in 1974
1974 establishments in Italy
UCI Women's World Tour races